The Witch and the Chameleon was a Canadian science fiction fanzine published 1974–1976 by Amanda Bankier in Hamilton, Ontario. It is generally recognized as the first explicitly feminist fanzine. It ran for five issues, the last being nominally a "double issue" numbered 5/6.

Bankier was invited to be Fan Guest of Honor at the first WisCon on February 11–13, 1977, because of her pioneering role as editor of The Witch and the Chameleon.

See also
 Janus (science fiction magazine)
 Feminist science fiction
 Women in speculative fiction

References

External links 
 Amanda Bankier's Guest of Honor speech at WisCon 1, 1977
 The Witch and the Chameleon on Fanlore

Science fiction magazines published in Canada
Defunct magazines published in Canada
Feminist criticism
Feminist literature
Feminist magazines
Feminist science fiction
Magazines disestablished in 1976
Magazines established in 1974
Magazines published in Ontario
Science fiction fanzines